Alexander Ursenbacher (born 26 April 1996) is a Swiss professional snooker player from Rheinfelden. He is Switzerland's first professional snooker player (former professional Darren Paris represented England, in the mid-1990s, before moving to Switzerland). He is often referred to by the nickname 'The Swiss Fish'.

Having qualified for the main tour through Q-School in 2013, where he defeated Paul Wykes in his quarter-final match, Ursenbacher lost his professional status upon the expiry of his two-year tour card in 2015, but regained it two years later after defeating Jackson Page 6–4 in the final of the 2017 EBSA European Under-21 Snooker Championship.

Career

Ursenbacher started playing snooker in 2008. He has won a host of junior titles in his native Switzerland and has won the national championship twice, due in large part to his stays at Snooker Academies in Sheffield and Gloucester and individual training by former World Championship semi-finalist Ian McCulloch.

In 2013 he turned professional by coming through Q School. After an early defeat in Event One, he played superbly throughout Event Two, losing just one frame in four matches and scoring a top break of 140. He beat nine-time Ladies' World Champion Reanne Evans 4–1, then in the final round he saw off experienced former pro Paul Wykes 4–0.

Ursenbacher experienced a tough start to his debut season as a professional, losing his first seven matches. His first win came in November at the minor-ranking Kay Suzanne Memorial Cup against former world champion Ken Doherty, and he was close to following it with another defeat of a world champion in the form of Peter Ebdon in the next round, ultimately losing 4–3.
He failed to win another match until the season-ending World Championship, where he came back from 6–2 down to win 10–7 against David Morris. He lost in the next round 10–5 to Thepchaiya Un-Nooh.

Ursenbacher qualified for the first ranking event of the 2014–15 season, the 2014 Wuxi Classic, by beating Kyren Wilson 5–4, but had to withdraw from the tournament due to being unable to enter China because of a visa problem. He defeated Martin O'Donnell 5–4 in the first round of qualifying for the Australian Goldfields Open, before losing 5–2 to Lyu Haotian and then lost a further 14 consecutive matches to be relegated from the tour as the world number 119. Ursenbacher won five games in the first event of Q School to reach the final round where he lost 4–1 to Daniel Wells. In the second event he was eliminated in the last 32 by Joe Roberts.

Out of the three European Tour events Ursenbacher entered in the 2015–16 season, he reached the first round of the Ruhr Open, where he lost 4–3 to Rod Lawler. He was knocked out in the opening round of the first Q School event, but in Event 2 he won five matches to stand just a game away from rejoining the professional tour. Ursenbacher lost it 4–2 against Alex Borg.

In March 2017 he won the EBSA European Under-21 Snooker Championship in Nicosia and with it re-qualified for the Main Tour. The victory also allowed Ursenbacher to get an invitation to the World Championship qualifying rounds; he defeated Robert Milkins 10–6 and Scott Donaldson 10–9 to reach the final round (he was the only amateur present at this stage), where he lost 10–4 to Yan Bingtao.

Ursenbacher recorded his best result to date by reaching the semi-finals of the 2017 English Open, defeating former world champion Shaun Murphy along the way; he lost 3–6 to Kyren Wilson. Ursenbacher's form declined after that, however, and he failed to win a single match for the rest of the season, aside from non-ranking event Shoot Out. The next season was hardly an improvement, although Ursenbacher caused a major upset at the 2019 Welsh Open by knocking out tournament favourite Ronnie O'Sullivan in the third round; he lost his next match to Zhao Xintong. After losing his first round qualifying match for the World Championship 4–10 to Jordan Brown, Ursenbacher was left 69th in the season-end rankings, confirming his relegation.

In June 2019, Ursenbacher came through Q-School - Event 3 by winning six matches to earn another two-year card on the World Snooker Tour for the 2019–20 and 2020–21 seasons.

In July 2020, he became the first Swiss player to qualify for the main draw World Championships. Ursenbacher was beaten in the first round 10–2 by 15th seed Barry Hawkins.

Performance and rankings timeline

Career finals

Pro-am finals: 4 (2 titles)

Amateur finals: 4 (3 titles)

Personal life 
Ursenbacher is the son of a Portuguese mother from Madeira Island, living in Switzerland.

See also

References

External links

Alexander Ursenbacher at worldsnooker.com

1996 births
Living people
Swiss snooker players
People from Rheinfelden District
Swiss people of Portuguese descent
Sportspeople from Aargau